William T. Esrey (born 1940 in Philadelphia, Pennsylvania) is an American businessman best known for his time as Chief Executive of Sprint Corporation. William now spends his time with his 5 grandchildren, William, Meg, Catherine, Madison, and Caroline or riding horses in Colorado.

Biography
Esrey attended Swarthmore College in 1957, Denison University in 1961, and graduated from Harvard Business School in 1964.

Esrey began his career in telecommunications in 1964 with AT&T. After becoming the youngest executive officer in the history of the company, Esrey left in 1970, joining investment banking firm Dillon, Read & Co. in New York City where after one year he became a managing director. It was at this point that Esrey considered turning his back on business and going to medical school, having had an interest during his teenage years when taken under the wing of a Kansas City physician. Esrey was given a close-up look at the day-to-day work of a doctor, but decided to stay in business

Sprint Telecom
In 1980, Esrey joined United Telecommunications as the executive vice president of corporate planning. In 1982, he became president of United Telecom Communications Inc., later named US Telecom. In 1985, Esrey was made president and CEO of United Telecommunications. In 1990, he became chairman of the company, which had now changed its name to Sprint. During his time in charge of Sprint, the company developed from a rural telephone company into a multibillion-dollar international corporation. Esrey served as Chairman of the Board for Sprint and United Telecom from 1990 to May 2003. He received many honors and awards and Business Week named him one of the top 25 business leaders in the world .In 1999, the board agreed to a merger with WorldCom, which failed due to antitrust concerns.

Tax
During his time as CEO and Chairman with Sprint, Esrey was paid an average of $25.5million per annum, including cash, bonuses and stock options. Most of this "income" was in stock options whose value was not realized due to the tech crash in 2000. Esrey earned a seven-figure salary, with annual bonuses ranging from $220,000 to $1.38 million.

It was at this point that the accounting firm Ernst & Young, Sprint's auditors, offered Esrey and Sprint COO Ron LeMay a scheme whereby the income taxes on their stock-option profits disappear for 30 years. Esrey and LeMay handed Ernst & Young $5.8 million to set up a tax shelter for their option income. But the tax shelter was not legal according to the IRS. Esrey and LeMay found they could owe over $100 million in taxes.

Sprint asked Esrey and LeMay to resign, releasing LeMay with just $190,400 in severance each month for the next eighteen months, and consulting fees that brought his total exit package to $5.8 million.  Sprint formally announced Esrey's departure with a package worth at least $10.5 million.

Other positions
Esrey held positions as:
The Equitable Life Assurance Society of the United States - Director
General Mills - Director, since 1989
Japan Telecom - Chairman
Panhandle Eastern Corp - director
Sprint Corporation - Chairman Emeritus

He served as Chairman of The Business Council from 2001 to 2002.

He was a trustee of the University of Kansas City, a trustee of the U.S. Ski and Snowboard Team Foundation, a director of the Heart of America United Way and the NCAA Foundation.

Personal life
Esrey is married to Julie (née Campbell), and the couple have two children, Bill and John.

References
Chakravarty, Subrata N. "Nimble Upstart" Forbes, Forbes, New York, May 8, 1995.
Silverman, Robin and Christine Riccelli. "William T. Esrey" Ingram's, Ingram Enterprises 1990.

External links
Bio at Forbes.com

1940 births
Living people
Businesspeople from Philadelphia
Swarthmore College alumni
Denison University alumni
Harvard Business School alumni
Sprint Corporation people